There have been two baronetcies created for persons with the surname Beauchamp, both in the Baronetage of the United Kingdom. Both titles are extinct.

The Beauchamp Baronetcy, of Grosvenor Place in the City of Westminster, was created in the Baronetage of the United Kingdom on 27 June 1911 for Edward Beauchamp, Liberal Member of Parliament for Lowestoft. He was the second son of Reverend William Henry Beauchamp, second son of Sir William Beauchamp-Proctor, 3rd Baronet (see Proctor-Beauchamp Baronets). The second Baronet was Conservative Member of Parliament for Walthamstow East. The title became extinct on his death in 1976.

The Beauchamp Baronetcy, of Woodborough in the County of Somerset, was created in the Baronetage of the United Kingdom on 4 October 1918 for Major Frank Beauchamp. The title became extinct on the death of the second Baronet in 1983.

For Beauchamp-Proctor baronets see Proctor-Beauchamp baronets

Beauchamp baronets, of Grosvenor Place (1911)
Sir Edward Beauchamp, 1st Baronet (1849–1925)
Sir Brograve Campbell Beauchamp, 2nd Baronet (1897–1976)

Beauchamp baronets, of Woodborough (1918)
Sir Frank Beachim Beauchamp, 1st Baronet (1866–1950)
Sir Douglas Clifford Beauchamp, 2nd Baronet (1903–1983)

See also 
 Baron Beauchamp

References

Kidd, Charles, Williamson, David (editors). Debrett's Peerage and Baronetage (1990 edition). New York: St Martin's Press, 1990.

Extinct baronetcies in the Baronetage of the United Kingdom
Beauchamp family